Edward Lambert à Beckett (11 August 1907 – 2 June 1989) was an Australian cricketer who played in four Test matches between 1928 and 1931. He played in 47 first-class matches for Victoria.

À Beckett was the second of three sons born to solicitor Thomas Archibald à Beckett and his wife Ada Mary à Beckett, née Lambert. His grandfather was the judge Sir Thomas à Beckett. He studied law at the University of Melbourne, entering Trinity College in 1927, where he excelled at sports, and represented the university in both cricket and Australian rules football before being seriously injured, fracturing his skull.

A solicitor by profession, after his retirement a'Beckett was involved in the administration of the Victorian Cricket Association.

References

Sources
 Piesse, K. & Davis, C. (2012) Encyclopedia of Australian Cricket Players, New Holland Publishers: Sydney. .

External links

1907 births
1989 deaths
People educated at Trinity College (University of Melbourne)
Australia Test cricketers
Victoria cricketers
Melbourne Cricket Club cricketers
Australian cricketers
Cricketers from Melbourne
Australian people of English descent
People from St Kilda, Victoria